Joseph Francis Holden (June 4, 1913 – May 10, 1996), nicknamed "Socks," was an American professional baseball player, manager and scout. He was a backup catcher in Major League Baseball who played from  through  for the Philadelphia Phillies. He was born in St. Clair, Pennsylvania.

Over parts of three major league seasons, Holden was a .083 hitter (2-for-24) with one run and one stolen base in 17 games. He did not hit for any extrabases and not drove in a run.

Holden died in his home city of St. Clair, Pennsylvania, at the age of 82.

External links
Baseball Reference
Retrosheet

1913 births
1996 deaths
Allentown Cardinals players
Allentown Wings players
Baseball players from Pennsylvania
Detroit Tigers scouts
Hazleton Mountaineers players
Major League Baseball catchers
Philadelphia Phillies players
People from St. Clair, Pennsylvania
Moultrie Packers players
Wilkes-Barre Barons players
Williamsport Grays players